Karla Bigham (born March 9, 1979) is an American politician and member of the Minnesota Senate, representing District 54. She is also a former Washington County Commissioner and former member of the Minnesota House of Representatives. She is a member of the Minnesota Democratic–Farmer–Labor Party (DFL).

Early life, education, and career
Bigham graduated from Park High School in Cottage Grove in 1997. She then went on to Winona State University in Winona,  earning a B.S. in paralegal with a sociology and political science minor. She was a member of Delta Phi Epsilon sorority. She has worked as a union organizer and is currently a paralegal in the Child Protection Division of the Hennepin County Attorney's Office in Minneapolis. She was a member of the Cottage Grove City Council from 2005 to 2007 and also served as chair of the Cottage Grove Public Safety, Health and Welfare Commission. She has worked as a public affairs coordinator for Northern Tier Energy.

Minnesota House of Representatives 
Bigham was elected to the Minnesota House of Representatives in 2006, where she represented District 57A, which included portions of Dakota and Washington counties in the southeastern Twin Cities metropolitan area. She was re-elected in 2008. Bigham did not seek re-election to a third term in 2010.

During her tenure, Bigham served as vice chair of the House Public Safety Policy and Oversight Committee. She also served on the House Environment Policy and Oversight Committee and the Finance subcommittees for the Public Safety Finance Division and the State Government Finance Division.

Minnesota Senate 
After Dan Schoen resigned from the Minnesota Senate following allegations of sexual harassment, Bigham announced her intention to run in the special election for the seat. She faced former Republican State Representative Denny McNamara and Libertarian candidate Emily Mellingen. Bigham won the special election.

Senator Bigham won re-election in the 2020 general election, receiving 52.85% of the vote.

For the 2021-2022 Legislative Session, Senator Bigham serves on the following committees:

 Ranking Minority Member on the Civil Law and Data Practices Policy
 Judiciary and Public Safety Finance and Policy
 Local Government Policy

Personal life 
Karla Bigham is married to John Stechmann and they reside in Cottage Grove, Minnesota.

References

External links

 Official Senate website
 Official campaign website
 Minnesota Public Radio Votetracker: Rep. Karla Bigham
 Project Votesmart - Rep. Karla Bigham Profile

1979 births
Living people
People from Cottage Grove, Minnesota
Democratic Party members of the Minnesota House of Representatives
Lutherans from Minnesota
Women state legislators in Minnesota
21st-century American politicians
21st-century American women politicians
People from Washington County, Minnesota